Lower Burlington is a community in the Canadian province of Nova Scotia, located in the Municipality of West Hants.

References
Lower Burlington on Destination Nova Scotia

Communities in Hants County, Nova Scotia
General Service Areas in Nova Scotia